Jana Černá (14 August 1928, Prague – 5 January 1981, Prague), born Jana Krejcarová, called "Honza" was a Czech poet, writer, and editor of samizdat editions in Czechoslovakia. She was a daughter of the journalist Milena Jesenská (1896-1944) and architect Jaromír Krejcar (1895-1950). After the communist coup d'état of 1948 she started publishing with her friends Egon Bondy,  and others in a secret underground edition Půlnoc. She was married 4 times and had 5 children. Černá died at the age of 52 in a car accident.

Work

 Hrdinství je povinné (1964)
 Nebyly to moje děti... (1966)
 Adresát Milena Jesenská (1969)
 V zahrádce otce mého (1988)
 Clarissa a jiné texty (1990)

External links
http://www.slovnikceskeliteratury.cz/showContent.jsp?docId=297
Clarissa a jiné texty
 Otisky duší
Conference proceedings of  "Honza Krejcarová. Internationaler Workshop Wien, 27. – 28.10.2016 VeranstalterInnen Dr. Matteo Colombi / GWZO LeipzigAss.-Prof. Mag. Dr. Gertraude Zand / Universität Wien und der tschechische Underground.(Re-)Konstruktion eines Mythos," dedicated to her life and work in the journal Slovo a smysl / Word and Sense with contributions by Matteo Colombi, Natascha Drubek, Xavier Galmiche, Martin Machovec, Anna Militz, Josef Vojvodík, Peter Zajac, Gertraude Zand: 2017 (14) 28. https://wordandsense.ff.cuni.cz/en/magazin/2017-14-28-2/

1928 births
1981 deaths
Czech women writers
Czech poets
Czech anti-communists
Surrealist poets
Czech surrealist writers
20th-century poets
Czech women poets
20th-century women writers
20th-century Czech people
Road incident deaths in Czechoslovakia